Junior Cycle is the first stage of the education programme for post-primary education within the Republic of Ireland. It is overseen by the State Examinations Commission of the Department of Education, the State Examinations Commission and the National Council for Curriculum and Assessment (NCCA).

The new specifications and curriculum reforms eventually replaced the Junior Certificate (first introduced in 1992). The new specifications (formally curriculum) have been introduced on a gradual phased basis since 2014, and was completed in 2022. The Junior Cycle Student Award is issued to students who have successfully completed their post-primary education and achieved a minimum standard in their Junior Cycle Assessments and Examinations.

A "recognised pupil" who commences the Junior Cycle must reach at least 12 years of age on 1 January of the school year of admission and must have completed primary education; the examination is normally taken after three years' study in a secondary school.

History

Intermediate Certificate

Intermediate Certificate ("Inter Cert"): introduced in 1924; originally for pupils at voluntary secondary schools (often boarding schools) after 3 or 4 years of study.

Group Certificate

Group, or Day Vocational, Certificate ("Group Cert", or "Day Cert"): introduced in 1947 for pupils at vocational schools after 2 years of study
The syllabuses of the Group Cert and Inter Cert were coordinated from 1968.

Junior certificate history

The first Junior Certificate syllabus was introduced in 1989 and examined in 1992. The new, modern Junior Certificate course was acclaimed as it was much more flexible than its predecessors. It quickly became the minimum requirement for getting a job in Ireland.

Near the end of the 1990s, the Department of Education and Science began to replace many subject curricula, particularly those that were dated, such as History and Geography. In 1999, Civic, Social, and Political Education was introduced as a subject and made mandatory from 2000, when Religious Education was also brought in. Religion was phased in with just a few schools adopting it in its first year, but now nearly all do the exam for Junior Cert, whilst CSPE was implemented nationwide. In 2002 a new Science course was introduced. The new course emphasised greater class participation and introduced the awarding of a percentage of marks for class practicals throughout the three years. However, many teachers complained about a lack of information from the Department about this change. Sample papers were not released until early 2006, the year when the new exam would be sat for the first time. Also, some schools complained that they did not have the laboratory facilities to do the new course but were forced to teach it anyway.

In 2004, results were made available on the Internet for the first time thus allowing students who, for instance, had moved school or left school to get their results without having to return to their old school. The lack of students taking honours Maths has been a consistent issue throughout the history of the Junior Certificate. However, in recent years the trend of taking honours Maths has increased positively.

Transition to the Junior Cycle
The Government of Ireland decided to review the post-primary curriculum due to changes in national and international teaching and learning strategies and policies. Throughout the late 1990s and early 2000s the Department of Education & Skills produced research and studies on what changes needed to be made to education in Ireland.
In late 2009 the Irish Government considered for a short period of time to completely scrap all Junior Cert examinations permanently.  The move was met with criticism and outrage from the Teachers' Union (ASTI), but the Government said that scrapping the annual examinations and replacing them with continuous assessment would save the country €30 million.
In 2011, the National Council for Curriculum and Assessment (NCCA) published reports proposing a major reform of the Junior Cycle following consultations with stakeholders, and amid concern over the heavy emphasis on "teaching to the test" in secondary schools. However, by October 2012 Teachers Unions and educationalists criticised the proposal by former Minister for Education & Skills Ruairi Quinn TD to abolish state exams in the Junior Cycle and 100 percent assessment by teachers.
On 15 January 2014, the Department of Education and Skills announced that the new name for the Junior Certificate will be called the "Junior Cycle Student Award".
After much delay and changes made to the framework by April 2014, teacher unions began industrial action, starting with the policy of non-cooperation with planning measures due to concerns in relation to impartially around correcting students assessments.
The government agreed to not scrap the Junior Certificate and instead, introduce a brand new syllabus in English for students starting First Year of secondary school in September 2014, with only 90% of the test going for a written exam. The other 10% is an assessment task taken during the third year. This is a reflection of the learning from the second Classroom-based Assessment (CBA). The first CBA takes place at the end of 2nd Year, which is an oral presentation. Students have 3 weeks to choose a topic and have to present it. The second CBA takes place at Christmas of 3rd Year. It is called the Collection of Texts in which a student will choose 4 written pieces throughout the 3 years from 4 different genres and will re-draft them. The CBA is graded using word descriptors and appear alongside the find grade on the Junior Cycle Profile of Achievement. The final written exam at higher and ordinary levels now only consists of a two-hour paper.
By 2015; the finalized report 'Framework for Junior Cycle' was circulated by the Department of Education & Skills issued by the former Minister for Education Jan O' Sullivan, TD. Education reform at post-primary was largely supported by all Government parties, despite political changes in government over the years; the largest political parties Fianna Fáil, Fine Gael and Labour continued to promote the framework issued by the NCCA. The 'Framework for Junior Cycle' provided a timeline of when the changes would occur over a gradual basis.
In 2016, pilots of the new system had been underway for three years, with the principal of St Joseph's College, Lucan, in particular noting that the "engagement in learning" proved to be a panacea for the school's discipline problems.
In 2017; English became the first subject to be issued with the new grading system.
English was reformed in 2014, Science and Business were reformed in 2016 and Irish, Mathematics and French were reformed in 2017. History and Geography will be reformed in 2019. The full Junior Cert was revised into the Junior Cycle Student Award in 2022.

Junior Certificate

The Junior Certificate or "Junior Cert" for short, is an educational qualification awarded in Ireland by the Department of Education to students who have successfully completed the Junior cycle of secondary education and achieved a minimum standard in their Junior Certificate Examination (Irish: Scrúdú an Teastais Shóisearaigh).

Typically a student takes 9 to 13 subjects – including English, Irish and Mathematics – as part of the Junior Cycle. The examination does not reach the standards for college or university entrance; instead, a school leaver in Ireland will typically take the Leaving Certificate Examination two or three years after completion of the Junior Certificate to reach that standard.

The objective of the Junior Cycle is:

The Examination
The final examination takes place after three years of the course, in early June. The exams always start with English, then the other core subjects and finish with the subjects that have the fewest candidates. They usually last two and a half weeks. The exams can take the form of written papers, aural exams (which are usually included at the start of the written paper), practical exams (for example, in Music, 25% of the final result is based on a performance and skills test in front of an examiner) and marks from course work assignments (such as in CSPE, where 60% of the exam rests on an action project completed during the school year). Exams normally range from two to two and a half hours long; most subjects are one paper only (i.e. they are taken in a single session), however, three subjects have two papers at a higher level – Irish and Mathematics. Until 2017, the English and business studies examination also had two papers at a higher level.

Schools with students taking the examinations will have one or more examination centres (individual enclosed rooms in which examinations take place), and almost always at least two, because the Leaving Certificate and Junior Certificate examinations cannot take place in the same centre. Smaller centres can be used for students with reasonable accommodations because of a learning or writing difficulty. Each exam centre is supervised by an external invigilator, usually a teacher from another school or an employee of the SEC. A staff member of the school is hired as an examination aide by the SEC to act as a liaison between the SEC and the school officials during the examination period. Candidates may not enter the exam centre after the first 30 minutes and are permitted to leave the centre after 30 minutes have passed, up until the last 15 minutes of the examination, although this practice has been abolished in some schools, and is discouraged in many others.

The Irish Times published an article where teachers expressed their concern that some syllabi for certain subjects (e.g. Business Studies) were not "up-to-date" with current events and would therefore not encourage students enough to think independently and apply theory to real-world scenarios.

Levels
At the Junior Certificate, students can take an examination subject at one of four levels. These are:

Higher Level (Irish: Ardleibhéal; sometimes called "Honours") – available in all subjects except CSPE, Science and Business Studies, Modern Foreign languages.
Ordinary Level (Irish: Gnáthleibhéal; sometimes called "Pass") – an easier course than Higher Level; available in all subjects except CSPE, Science and Business Studies, Modern Foreign languages.
Foundation Level (Irish: Bonnleibhéal) – an easier course than Ordinary Level; available only in Irish and Mathematics.
Common Level (Irish: Leibhéal Comónta) – available only in CSPE, Science and Business Studies, Modern Foreign languages.

The level taken at Junior Certificate may have bearing on the level taken in the Leaving Certificate; thus, for instance, a student could take an Ordinary level in the Junior Certificate and then could not take a Higher level in the corresponding Leaving Certificate subject, later.

Grading

A mark below 10% receives no grade. Above this, there are six ranges of 15%, from F up to A. Grades A, B, C and D are passing grades, E and F are failing grades; therefore, the pass mark for the Junior Cert is 40%.

Irish
In the Junior Certificate candidates have the option of answering either in Irish (only if they have been in the Irish stream) or in English, except in the case of the subjects Irish and English and questions in other language subjects. Certain subjects and components are not available for bonus marks, marks awarded also vary depending on the written nature of the subject.

Exemptions
Students who face disadvantages (e.g. suffer spelling problems caused by dyslexia, dyspraxia, dysgraphia, or other disorders such as Autism Spectrum Disorder or ADHD) cannot be penalised for poor spelling in exams such as English and Irish. These candidates will then be marked more leniently on all topics (e.g. if a student has a spelling problem in English they will be marked out of 50 for their mechanics).

Results
Junior Cert results are not a prerequisite for the Leaving Certificate, so that all students may continue to their next year of education no matter what their results. The Junior Certificate (and more so, the Leaving Certificate) results take centre place in the Irish media during the week surrounding their release. The newspapers publish various statistics about the exam and cover high achievers (some receive ten or more "A" grades). In 2019 much controversy was caused by the delaying of the results from the usual 12–15 September dates until 4 October.

Appealing grades
If a student is unhappy with a grade they received on any of the exam results, they may appeal the decision made by the SEC. They need to pay a fee (in 2010 the fee was set at €32 per exam) and the principal of the school writes a letter of appeal application to the State Examinations Commission, stating the candidate's name, exam number and the exam they would like to appeal. There is a deadline to appeal, usually 14–21 days after the results are published, in which the student's application must be made. The appeal results are usually handed out mid-November. The grade that is received this time is final, and no more appeals can be made. If the candidate's grade did not change, no further action will be taken. However, if a change did occur, then the candidate will be refunded the appeal fee via a Cheque made out to the principal of the school. These refunds take time to be issued, but in an appeal made in September of one year, the refund was issued as late as March in the following year.

Drop-outs
Although school attendance in Ireland is very high, some students drop out of the education system after completion of the Junior Certificate. Those who stay in the education system sit the Leaving Certificate – the requirement for university entry in Ireland. A new type of Leaving Certificate, the Leaving Certificate Applied has been designed to discourage people from dropping out. This is all practical work and students may work after school or do an apprenticeship, respectively.

The vast majority of students continue from lower level to senior level, with only 12.3% leaving after the Junior Certificate. This is lower than the EU average of 15.2%.

Junior cycle framework

The NCCA issued a new language and policy around post-primary education in Ireland. Each subject curriculum will be replaced by 'specifications' supported by Key Skills (6 in total) and 24 Statements of Learning. 

All subjects incorporate all six key skills, however, most subjects only incorporate some of the Statements of Learning. The new framework issued by the NCCA proposed the development of Short Courses; the NCCA has issued specifications for some Short Courses however, schools have the opportunity to create their own short courses that are relevant to their school community. 

Built into the specifications and short courses is a re-emphasis on literacy and numeracy. Student-centred learning is to the fore in these specifications along with in-class assessments and written examinations. 

Changes have been made to subject levels; under the Junior Certificate Examinations framework there were three levels, Higher, Ordinary and Foundation. Under the framework for Junior Cycle reforms only Irish, Maths and English will have two levels (Higher & Ordinary) all other subjects will have one 'common level'. 

Students can only study up to 10 subjects (under the previous Junior Certificate there was no limit).

A "recognised junior pupil" must undertake all the mandatory subjects and at least two of the optional subjects, except insofar as exemptions or exclusions apply. In certain types of schools, subjects in the optional grouping (or a selection from combinations of them) may, in fact, be mandatory, for instance, History and Geography are mandatory in certain types of schools. Most schools do not offer all the optional subjects but must offer all the mandatory and certain optional subjects.

Each subject is examined at one of three levels, Higher Level (informally Honours), Ordinary Level (informally Pass), or Foundation Level. Foundation Level may only be taken in two subjects: Irish and Mathematics. All other subjects may be taken at either Ordinary or Higher Level.

Mandatory subjects

Irish/Gaelige (Higher or Ordinary)† 
English (Higher or Ordinary) 
Maths (Higher or Ordinary) 
Wellbeing (Common Level) ≈
History (Special Core Status)

† An exemption from taking Irish may be awarded in some cases, for students with a specific learning difficulty such as dyslexia or Autism Spectrum Disorder, or those who did not attend school in the country before their twelfth birthday.
≈ A new compulsory field of learning "Wellbeing" will be introduced, incorporating Physical Education; Social, Personal and Health Education (SPHE), including relationships and sexuality; and Civic, Social and Political Education (CSPE).

Common level subjects

Arts and Humanities
Ancient Greek‡
Art, Craft & Design
Classical Studies‡
Latin‡
Music (Listening, Composing & General Study)
Religious education (Some schools do Religious Education without examining it)
 Business studies

‡Classical Studies can not be taken by a student who is also taking Greek or Latin.

Modern languages
French
German
Spanish
Italian

Sciences
Environmental and Social Studies
Geography
Home Economics
Science

Applied Sciences
Materials Technology (Wood)
Metalwork (Materials & Technology)
Technical Graphics
Technology

Other
Typewriting (2016 was the final year of examination, per DoE Circular 0061/2014)

Short Courses
The NCCA circulated specifications for 'Short Courses'. Students will be introduced to a variety of subjects which are linked to the statements of learning and are designed for approximately 100 hours of student engagement. 9 Short Courses have been introduced however, schools have the opportunity to develop their own Short Courses which reflect their school community as long as they fit into the framework for Junior Cycle. Students have the opportunity to take up to 4 short courses and substitute these for more long-form non-mandatory subjects. 
 
Civic, Social and Political Education
Social, Personal and Health Education
Physical Education
Coding	
A Personal Project: Caring for Animals	
Exploring Forensic Science
Digital Media Literacy	
Chinese Language and Culture	
Artistic Performance
Philosophy

Assessment and examinations 
On completion, each student will be issued with the Junior Cycle Student Award.  For every subject, students will engage with two structured classroom-based assessments, one each in second and third year. A written assessment task supervised by teachers in class will be completed in third year and marked by the State Examinations Commission. Written exams at the end of third year are shorter - no longer than two hours. A Junior Cycle Profile of Achievement (JCPA) will be issued to students by their schools; this will record learning arising from short courses; classroom assessments and the results of state exams.

Most subjects will have up to two in-class assessments and subjects such as Geography, Science and History will have a project to complete. The final examination takes place after three years of the course, in early June. The exams always start with English, then the other core subjects and finish with the subjects that have the fewest candidates. Most exam papers were between 2.5 hours and 3 hours however under the new system examinations will be no longer than 2 hours long. The majority of subjects will be common level with exception to Irish, English and Maths.

Irish

In the Junior Certificate candidates have the option of answering either in Irish (only if they have been in the Irish stream) or in English, except in the case of the subjects Irish and English and questions in other language subjects. Certain subjects and components are not available for bonus marks, marks awarded also vary depending on the written nature of the subject.

Exemptions

Students who face disadvantages (e.g. suffer spelling problems caused by dyslexia, dyspraxia, dysgraphia, or other disorders such as Autism Spectrum Disorder or ADHD) can not be penalised for bad spellings in exams such as English and Irish. These candidates will then be marked easier on all topics (e.g. if a student has a spelling problem in English they will be marked out of 50 for their mechanics).

Junior Cycle grading 

In 2017, English got a new grading system, as part of the new Junior Cycle. This is being introduced into other subjects with examination in Science and Business Studies starting in 2019.
The grading is as follows:
 90 to 100% = Distinction
 75 to 89% = Higher Merit
 55 to 74% = Merit
 40 to 54% = Achieved
 20 to 39% = Partially Achieved
 0 to 19% = Not Graded/NG

After the exam
It is not possible to fail Junior Cycle overall: all students continue to their next year of education no matter what their results, but most schools will not permit a student to take a Leaving Cert subject at Higher Level if they did not receive at least a Merit grade at Junior Cycle. The Junior Cycle (and more so, the Leaving Certificate) results take centre place in the Irish media during the week surrounding their release. National and local newspapers publish various statistics about the exam and cover high achievers.

Transition year

Transition Year (TY) is an optional one-year programme that can be taken in the year after the Junior Certificate in Ireland and is intended to make the senior cycle a three-year programme encompassing both Transition Year and Leaving Certificate. The idea of such a year is strange in other countries, as they don't have the same year. Transition Year was created as a result of the Programme for Economic and Social Progress which called for a six-year cycle of post-primary education.

See also 
Education in the Republic of Ireland
Irish Leaving Certificate

References

Additional sources

External links
 State Examinations Commission
 2016 Junior Cert Exam Timetable

Secondary education in Ireland
Secondary school qualifications